Rehimena reductalis is a moth in the family Crambidae. It was described by Aristide Caradja in 1932. It is found in Shanghai, China.

References

Spilomelinae
Moths described in 1932